Ghaith Jumaa (Arabic:غيث جمعة) (born 2 November 1988) is a Qatari footballer. He currently plays for Muaither .

External links
 

Qatari footballers
1988 births
Living people
Al-Khor SC players
Al-Sailiya SC players
Al Ahli SC (Doha) players
Al-Rayyan SC players
Muaither SC players
Qatar Stars League players
Qatari Second Division players
Association football goalkeepers